Bala is an unincorporated community in Bala Township, Riley County, Kansas, United States.  As of the 2020 census, the population of the community and nearby areas was 29.

History
Bala settled about 1862. It was a shipping point on the Chicago, Rock Island and Pacific Railroad. It is named after Bala, in Wales.

A post office was opened in Bala in 1871, and remained in operation until it was discontinued in 1966.

Demographics

For statistical purposes, the United States Census Bureau has defined Bala as a census-designated place (CDP).

Education
The community is served by Riley County USD 378 public school district.

References

Further reading

External links
 Riley County maps: Current, Historic, KDOT

Unincorporated communities in Riley County, Kansas
Unincorporated communities in Kansas